Spitamen District is a district in north-central Sughd, Tajikistan, stretching across the province's narrow part from the border with Uzbekistan to the border with Kyrgyzstan. Population 141,600 (2020 est.). Formerly called Nau District or Nov District, it was renamed Spitamen district by a resolution of parliament in November 2003. The district capital is Navkat, located south-west of Khujand.

The district is named after Spitamen who led the Sogdians in a revolt against the forces of Alexander the Great in 329-328 BCE.

Administrative divisions
They are as follows:

References

Districts of Tajikistan
Sughd Region